Millerosaurus is an extinct genus of millerettid parareptile from the Late Permian (Changhsingian stage) of South Africa. It was a small animal which reached a length of 30 cm. Unlike many other parareptiles, it had holes (fenestrae) behind the eyesockets in the skull. It had a slabsided body, a long tail, and a narrow but triangular skull (about 2 inches long) with large eyes, and is thought to have been insectivorous.

References 

Parareptiles
Permian reptiles of Africa
Prehistoric reptile genera